Eddy Lord Dombraye (born 11 November 1979) is a Nigerian professional football manager and player.

Career
After playing in Nigeria with Premier Breweries, Iwuanyanwu Nationale and Bendel Insurance, he moved to Poland in 1998 to play with Ekstraklasa club ŁKS Łódź. After playing with Stomil Olsztyn, he moved to FR Yugoslavia in 2002 to play with OFK Beograd. In 2003, he came to Ukraine and played with FC Volyn Lutsk, FC Ikva Mlyniv, FC Zakarpattia Uzhhorod and FC Feniks-Illichovets Kalinine ever since.

Dombraye played for Nigeria at the 1999 FIFA World Youth Championship finals in Nigeria. Before that he debuted for the Nigerian main national team entering as a substitute in a 1998 African Cup of Nations qualification game against Burkina Faso. He was sacked by the management of Lobi Stars on the 21st of March, 2022 following his poor performance since the start of the 2021/22 NPFL season.

Honours
FIFA World Youth Championship quarter-finalist: 1999

References

External sources
 
 
 

Living people
1979 births
Sportspeople from Port Harcourt
Nigerian footballers
Nigeria international footballers
Nigeria under-20 international footballers
Nigerian expatriate footballers
Association football forwards
Bendel Insurance F.C. players
Heartland F.C. players
ŁKS Łódź players
Ekstraklasa players
OKS Stomil Olsztyn players
Expatriate footballers in Poland
Nigerian expatriate sportspeople in Poland
OFK Beograd players
Expatriate footballers in Serbia and Montenegro
FC Volyn Lutsk players
FC Hoverla Uzhhorod players
Ukrainian Premier League players
Expatriate footballers in Ukraine
Nigerian expatriate sportspeople in Ukraine